Vincent Lamont Buck (born January 12, 1968 in Owensboro, Kentucky) is a former American football safety in the National Football League for the New Orleans Saints.  He played college football at Central State University in Wilberforce, Ohio, where Buck was an NAIA All-American and NAIA Player of the Year in his senior year 1989. He was drafted in the 2nd round of the 1990 NFL Draft by the New Orleans Saints, where he played six seasons. After his playing career was over, Buck has been active in the New Orleans community. Vince Buck is currently the owner and proprietor of a Cottman transmission service center in New Orleans, and resides in Kenner, Louisiana.

External links
 http://www.neworleans.com/sports/saints/274805-where-are-they-now-former-saints-defensive-back-vince-buck.html

1968 births
Living people
Sportspeople from Owensboro, Kentucky
Players of American football from Kentucky
American football cornerbacks
American football safeties
Central State Marauders football players
New Orleans Saints players
Ed Block Courage Award recipients